is a book attributed to Jiddu Krishnamurti (18951986), authored when he was 14 years old. Written under the name , it was first published in 1910. The work was closely related to the World Teacher Project, a contemporary messianic endeavor launched by the Theosophical Society. The book is considered a spiritual classic and was still in print in 2012. By that time it had been published in dozens of editions and had been translated in many languages; by 2004 early editions were in the public domain. Throughout its publication history the work has also generated controversy, regarding the author's identity.

Background

The work was an important early milestone of the World Teacher Project, a worldwide enterprise launched by the Theosophical Society in early  This endeavor, which received widespread publicity, proclaimed the imminent arrival of the World Teacher, a new messiah. Jiddu Krishnamurti, an adolescent Brahmin from South India, and the presumed author of At the Feet of the Master, was considered the likely "vehicle" for the World Teacher. As a result, the book was seen as being closely related to Krishnamurti's expected mission, an early indication of his spiritual and worldly destiny.

About the work

The title was reputedly chosen by Annie Besant, thenPresident of the Theosophical Society, who was also Krishnamurti's legal guardian.

The original edition's front cover features an illustration (in gold on blue background), of a path leading to an Egyptian-style gateway; in the frontispiece there is a contemporary photograph of Alcyone. The book includes a preface by Besant, and a dedication page with the inscription, "To those who knock". Following, is an additional full-page photograph of Alcyone (uncaptioned), a page with a short, unattributed quote in Sanskrit and English, and a foreword by Alcyone. The body of the work is then laid out in four parts, corresponding to its proclaimed requirements for disciples on the spiritual path:

The book closes with an unsigned, two-verse devotional poem.

The following is stated in the book's foreword: "These are not my words; they are the words of the Master who taught me. This is related to Leadbeater's statement that over a period of about five months during , Master Kuthumi (or Koot Hoomi) a postulated embodied spiritual entity was releasing to Krishnamurti, through a mystical process and while the boy was asleep, the spiritual instruction that makes up the work. Upon waking, Krishnamurti "with great laboriousness" put the instructions into notes; afterwards, the notes were checked for spelling and grammar, and then arranged and typed by Leadbeater. The resulting typescript formed the basis for the book's original edition; Krishnamurti's handwritten notes were lost sometime after the book's publication.

Publication history
The original edition was published at Adyar, India, through the facilities of The Theosophist, the Society's main organ; the publisher is listed as "Theosophist Office, Adyar". The book, introduced during the  Theosophical Convention at Adyar, was bound in blue cloth, with a limited number of copies bound in blue leather.

This edition quickly sold out; within a year the book had been published in twenty-seven editions, and by 1925 there were at least forty. In the ensuing decades, dozens of editions in many languages and formats were published by Theosophical and non-Theosophical publishers, including the Star Publishing Trust (SPT), publishing arm of the World Teacher Project. Following its founding in 1926, the SPT had assumed the copyright to the work. Meanwhile, according to one source, the original edition of the book may have never been legally copyrighted.

The book is considered a spiritual classic, and was still in print in 2012. Around that time, early editions of the work had been in the public domain within several jurisdictions.

Select editions

Later editions may list the author as both Alcyone and Jiddu Krishnamurti, or solely as Jiddu Krishnamurti. They may also omit material, or add new material.

  edition is in the public domain .
 
  expanded edition includes "Towards Discipleship", a previously published private transcript of informal 1924 talks by Krishnamurti, and background material by John Algeo, past president of the Theosophical Society in America.

Reception

The book was enthusiastically received by Theosophists and members of the Order of the Star in the East, a worldwide organization established by the Theosophical leadership to promote the World Teacher Project. According to a Krishnamurti biographer,  since Blavatsky, carried the sort of authority soon ascribed to Alcyone's document"; contemporary press reports described it as "a holy book to his  disciples". It was republished as "The Word of the Master" in 1929.

The extraordinary publicity surrounding Krishnamurti and the World Teacher Project brought increased attention to the book. Favorable early press coverage was complemented by more neutral or strict assessments, which included the tentative characterization of Krishnamurti's writing style as "artless".

Others have found the book  though not  draws on the pious morality that  all ". It has also been pointed out that the main body's themes, and four-part layout, bear close resemblance to Advaita Vedanta treatises by, or attributed to, the  Indian philosopher and theologian Adi Shankara.

Despite the demise of the World Teacher Project in 1929, and the subsequent dismantling of the infrastructure supporting it (which included the book), millions of copies have been sold. Soon after its original publication, commentaries and detailed analyses by prominent Theosophists started to appear, "in which every line of Alcyone's original is weighed, analyzed, laboriously expanded upon"; in addition, the book became a frequent subject of lectures, a practice that continued past the Project's ending, and into the early 21st century. The work reputedly also played a role in later occult endeavors by Leadbeater.

Authorship debate
The identity of the author has been the subject of debate, starting with the appearance of the first edition. It has been proposed that Leadbeater was the actual producer of the work; this proposition has had opponents as well as supporters. Shortly after the original publication, the matter found its way to court in India. It was brought up during a custody battle over Krishnamurti between Besant and Jiddu Narayaniah, Krishnamurti's father. Narayaniah believed the book was "fathered" on Krishnamurti in order to promote his messianic credentials, citing as one proof the boy's poor prior knowledge of English. In related litigation, Besant alleged The Hindu newspaper was in contempt over the "publication of certain  relating to the authorship of the book At the feet of the Master.

Since the original publication, statements reputedly made by Krishnamurti have appeared in a variety of sources, implying he accepted or rejected authorship; his own recorded statements on the matter have been subject to interpretation. Decades after the original publication, he stated that he had no memory of writing it, although he did not discount the possibility.

As the original notes by Krishnamurti are missing, the extent of any differences with Leadbeater's typescript and with the original published edition is not clear. The debate regarding the role of Krishnamurti in the production and promotion of this work persisted, a century after its original publication.

See also
 Jiddu Krishnamurti bibliography

Notes

References

 
 
 
 
 
 
 
 
  .

External links

 .

1910 non-fiction books
Books by Jiddu Krishnamurti
Theosophical texts
Works published under a pseudonym